For the Love of Ray J 2  is the second season of For the Love of Ray J on VH1.  This season Ray J will bring 19 women to see which one is the love of his life.

Contestants

Call-out order

 The contestant won Ray J's love.
 The contestant went on an individual date with Ray J.
 The contestant went on a group date with Ray J.
 The contestant went on a group date and won some alone time with Ray J.
 The contestant was not see receiving a glass, but was briefly shown holding one and stayed.
 The contestant was eliminated.
 The contestant won a date with Ray J, but was eliminated.
 The contestant won a  solo date with Ray J, but was eliminated.
 The contestant quit the competition.

Notes
 In Episode 5, Ray J went on a date with every girl.
 In Episode 6, Jaguar won the challenge, won a solo date, but was still eliminated.
 In Episode 7, Ray did not hand out glasses, but said who was safe in order.
 In Episode 8, There were no challenges or dates, Ray had 2 girls from last season come back and review feedback from the girls to him to help make his decision.
 In Episode 11, there was no elimination due to Luscious quitting the competition.

Episodes

That's What's Up

First aired: November 2, 2009
 Bottom 4: Diego, Fettucini, Luscious, Tipsy
 Eliminated: Tipsy, Diego, Fettucini

Reasons for elimination
 Tipsy: Ray J felt he had no connection with her, due to her being too tipsy.
 Diego: Ray J felt she was only getting know Ray J as an artist, not as a person.
 Fettucini: Ray J felt she wanted to date him for his celebrity status.

Episode notes
 During elimination, when Ray J got down to one glass, he said there were only four women left, but there are five women seemingly without glasses.  Gifts is not seen receiving a glass, but she is shown holding one. 
 When talking to Diego, Ray J listed his 5 favorite R&B artists to be Stevie Wonder, Michael Jackson, Whitney Houston, Luther Vandross, and Ray Charles.
 Fettucini has claimed on the way to the house that she has dated Tyson Beckford.
 Gifts was originally going to be called Jingle Bells by Ray J, but it was changed to Gifts on advice from Lil B.
 Just like Chardonnay on the first episode of the first season, Extra did splits for Ray J.

Ray's Leading Ladies

First aired: November 9, 2009
 Challenge: Create Movie Scenes To Act Out With Ray
 Challenge winners: Jaguar, Lava, Luscious
 Bottom 3: Extra, Gifts, Trouble
 Eliminated: Gifts, Trouble

Reasons for elimination
 Gifts: Ray J felt her movie scene she created was confusing, picturing the relationship being only sexual, equating it to a one-night stand with "no happy ending".
 Trouble: Ray J heard from the other girls she was too drunk and she was ready to give up.

Episode notes
 In her movie scene, Just Right alluded to Ray J's sex tape with Kim Kardashian.
 Ray J immediately picked the three girls (Jaguar, Luscious, and Lava) who won dates with him first during elimination.
 In a bonus clip, when Ray J was talking to Heartbreaker, a cameraman accidentally slip and fell in the pool.
 In a bonus clip, Ray J stated that he does not like girls having onion breath.

Not Again Dre...

First aired: November 16, 2009
 Guest star: La La, Super Crew
 Challenge: Dance Battle Challenge
 Team 1 (Hot Damn Crew): Caliente, Exotica, Extra, Jaguar, Paradeez
 Team 2 (Stingrays): Adorable, Flossy, Heartbreaker, Platinum, Popper,
 Team 3 (Talk Of The Town): Just Right, Lava, Lucsious, Mz. Berry
 Challenge winner(s): Team 3 (Talk Of The Town)
 Bottom 3: Just Right, Lava, Luscious
 Eliminated: Just Right, Lava

Reasons for elimination
 Just Right: Ray J felt no chemistry between her.
 Lava: Ray J felt Lava was too demanding and weird.

Episode notes
 Ray J's friend DJ Dre Sinatra told Ray J that he slept with Luscious.  In the first season, it was revealed that Danger slept with Ray J's producer Detail.
 Extra had shorter hair in this episode, being noticeable during elimination.
 Unlike the previous episode, all the girls who won the date were at the chopping blocks, with the exception of Mz. Berry, who got her glass first.

Too Little Too Late

First aired: November 23, 2009
 Challenge: Style Ray For A Sean John Photo Shoot
 Team 1: Flossy, Jaguar, Platinum
 Team 2: Extra, Heartbreaker, Luscious
 Team 3: Exotica, Paradeez, Popper
 Team 4: Adorable, Caliente, Mz Berry
 Challenge Winner(s): Flossy, Jaguar, Platinum
 Solo Date: Jaguar
 Bottom 3: Adorable, Jaguar, Popper
 Eliminated: Popper, Adorable

Reasons for Elimination
 Popper: Ray J felt Popper came off a little too strong.
 Adorable: Ray J felt she's not making an effort to connect with him.
Episode Notes
 Unlike previous episodes, Ray J send his message in person instead of a video message.

Mean Girls

First aired: November 30, 2009
 Challenge:  None
 Challenge Winner(s):  None
 1st Destination: Beach
 1st Date: Caliente, Extra, Flossy, Platinum
 1st Solo Date: Mz. Berry
 2nd Destination: Bowling
 2nd Date: Exotica, Heartbreaker, Jaguar
 Exotica: 16 pts.
 Jaguar: 76 pts.
 Heartbreaker: 77 pts.
 Win/Alone Time: Heartbreaker
 3rd Destination: Backyard Spa Treatment
 3rd Date: Luscious, Paradeez
 Bottom 2: Heartbreaker, Paradeez
 Eliminated: Paradeez

Reasons for elimination
 Paradeez: Ray J felt Paradeez never had a connection with him even after their one-on-one date.  He felt that Paradeez is boring and has nothing to say to him.

Episode notes
 Ray J has a date with every girl, instead of having a challenge.
 Heartbreaker throws a glass of wine on Flossy, but Flossy told Ray J that Luscious threw it first.
 Caliente tackles Flossy while playing football on the beach with Ray J.
 Jaguar, Heartbreaker, and Exotica wanted to battle for alone time for Ray J by bowling.
 Ray J took Mz. Berry to Beso, a restaurant founded by Eva Longoria in Hollywood.
 When Ray J asked some questions concerning Mz. Berry's divorce, Mz. Berry interviewed she was actually glad he asked those questions.
 Lil B does not appear in this episode, but she appears in a bonus clip where she deliberates with Ray J.

Ray J Fever

First aired: December 7, 2009
 Guest Star: Brandy, La La
 Challenge: Come Up To Four Lyrics And Performance To Make A 70's Song
 Las Reinas De Oro: Caliente, Exotica, Jaguar
 The Sun Rays: Extra, Flossy, Mz. Berry
 The Wolf Pack: Heartbreaker, Luscious, Platinum
 Challenge Winner(s): Caliente, Exotica, Jaguar
 Solo Date: Jaguar
 Bottom 2: Exotica, Jaguar
 Eliminated: Jaguar

Reasons for Elimination
 Jaguar: After four dates, Ray J still could not feel a connection, due to her still having a wall.  Due to this, Ray felt she is taking the connection too slow.

Episode Notes
 Caliente brought drinks to Ray J and Exotica to interrupt and end Exotica's one-on-one time with Ray.
 Extra gets a one on one time with Ray J, but Heartbreaker cut it short.
 Heartbreaker, Luscious, and Platinum gave Ray a bubble bath.
 Ray J and Jaguar sing together during their solo date. Ray J later completes and records the song titled "Can we fall in love"

The Amazing Rays

First aired: December 14, 2009
 Guest Stars: DeShawn Stevenson of the Washington Wizards, Danny Granger of the Indiana Pacers, Shorty Mack
 Challenge: Race Through Los Angeles
 Blue Team: Heartbreaker, Mz. Berry
 Green Team: Flossy, Luscious
 Pink Team: Caliente, Platinum
 Yellow Team: Exotica, Extra
 Challenge Winner(s): Caliente, Platinum
 2nd Place: Exotica, Extra
 3rd Place: Flossy, Luscious
 4th Place: Heartbreaker, Mz. Berry
 Bottom 2: Extra, Mz. Berry
 Eliminated: Extra

Reasons for Elimination
 Extra: Ray felt she was treating him more like a crush than a love interest.

Episode Notes
 Ray went back to address the girls the challenge on video.
 Ray did not hand out glasses, but said who was safe in order.  But at the end of elimination, he spray champagne among the girls.
 After eating the chili cheese dogs, the green team, pink, and the yellow team chose the athletic challenge (each girl shoots a three-pointer), while the blue team chose the artistic challenge (girls plays out a melody).
 Mz. Berry cried three times in this episode: crying after coming in last in the challenge, during lunch with Lil B and the rest of the girls (excluding Caliente), and in Ray's bedroom.

Dangers Liaisons

First aired: December 21, 2009
 Special Guest:  Chardonnay and Danger from the first season
 Challenge: None
 Challenge Winner(s): None
 Bottom 3: Exotica, Flossy, Heartbreaker
 Eliminated: Exotica, Flossy

Reasons for Elimination
 Exotica: Ray eliminated her because she's not making an effort to spending more time with him.
 Flossy: Ray felt she was a little too young for him.

Episode Notes
 Danger & Chardonnay from Season 1 came back to help Ray make his decision.
 Most of Danger's and Chardonnay's feedback of the girls were negative partly due to fact that both of them still has some feelings for Ray.  Ray later felt that bringing Chardonnay and Danger could be a mistake.
 In two bonus clips, Ray found out that Heartbreaker had a brown tooth.
 The night Chardonnay came to the house, Flossy was so drunk that she peed in the potted plant instead of walking to the bathroom.

The Truth Will Set You Free

First aired: January 4, 2010
 Challenge: Lie Detector Test
 Challenge Winner(s): N/A
 Bottom 2: Heartbreaker, Platinum
 Eliminated: Heartbreaker

Reasons for Elimination
 Heartbreaker: Ray felt that she broke his heart when he found out that she does not want to end up with him.

Episode Notes
 Since the 70's challenge, Heartbreaker, Luscious, and Platinum have kept their group name The Wolfpack.  But during this episode, the three girls have bigger concerns for Ray J than Caliente and Mz. Berry.  During elimination, Ray J finally disbanded the group by sending Heartbreaker home.
 The reason why Mz. Berry does not trust Ray because there are other girls around in the competition.
 Ray found out that Caliente is also a TV show host and she has a long first name, being shortened to one name for immigration purposes.
 Ray was disappointed at Luscious for being "soft" on Platinum through interrogation.
 Ray found out that Platinum still has some feelings for her ex-boyfriend.

The Breaking Point

First aired: January 11, 2010
 First Date: Mz. Berry, Luscious
 Second Date: Caliente, Platinum
 Alone Time: Mz. Berry
 Bottom 2: Platinum, Caliente
 Eliminated: Caliente

Reasons for Elimination
 Caliente: Ray felt that Caliente is holding back her feelings and she is not serious in committing to a strong relationship.

Episode Notes
 During elimination, Ray wanted to talk to each girl privately.
 Ray took Luscious and Mz. Berry horseback riding.
 Ray took Caliente and Platinum go-kart racing.
 Even though Mz. Berry spend a night with Ray, she is still jealous of the other girls being around Ray the next day.  Ray later told Mz. Berry during elimination that he needs to spend time with every girl so he can make the right decision.

Homie Invasion

First aired: January 18, 2010
 Guest Stars: Snoop Dogg, Brandy, Tom Green, Shorty Mack, Noel "Detail" Fisher
 Challenge: None
 Challenge Winner(s): None
 Bottom: None
 Quit: Luscious

Reasons for Quitting
 Luscious: She felt disrespected when Ray's friends kept chanting that she "smashed the homie" and felt Ray did not do anything to stop them.
Episode Notes
 Brandy asked each girl, if they are not chosen, who will be chosen?  Luscious picked Platinum, Platinum surprisingly picked Mz. Berry, while Mz. Berry picked no one.
 Brandy chose Mz. Berry for Ray to pick, while Snoop chose Platinum.  Ray's other homies cannot make a decision as a group.
 When Luscious felt like she wanted to give up, this upsets Ray so much that he tells her to leave the house.
 After Luscious left, Ray talked to Mz. Berry and Platinum and told them that Luscious would have been eliminated anyway.

Clip Show

First aired: January 25, 2010

Includes:
 Trouble being too drunk.
 Girls love to dance.
 Extra being extra.
 The Wolfpack targeting different girls in the house.
 Luscious being quirky.
 Caliente learning English.
 Danger bossing around the other girls.
 Chardonnay attempting to come back to the competition, but Ray saying no.

Episode notes
 After Luscious went home, Mz. Berry and Platinum also met Ray's parents.
 Just like in season one, Ray's mother said no to both girls for Ray, but she and Ray's father asked Ray to consider the pros and cons of being with each girl.

Come Away With Me

First aired: February 1, 2010
 Dates: Ray J takes each girl on an individual date.
 Platinum's Date: Went to Las Vegas
 Mz.Berry's Date: Went on Ray's yacht
 Winner: Mz. Berry

Reasons for Elimination
 Platinum: Ray felt that Platinum reminded him of his past relationships.

Episode Notes
 Once Mz. Berry was chosen the winner, winning Ray's heart, both Ray and Mz. Berry flew off on a private jet to a destination unknown.

Reunion Show

First aired: February 8, 2010
 Ray reunites with all the girls in the house.
 Lava reveals that she has been dating Jamaican Olympic sprinter, Usain Bolt.
 Ray realizes that eliminating Jaguar was a mistake, hinting that he has feelings for her.
 Ray apologizes to Jaguar for eliminating her and she tells him that they can get together someday if he and Mz. Berry do not work out.
 Ray sees Mz. Berry for the first time in 5 months.  But Mz. Berry stated later that she did see Ray before the reunion.
 Cocktail, the winner from Season 1, comes on the show to warn Mz. Berry that Ray cannot be tied down to one woman.
 Ray and Cocktail get in a heated argument.

References

External links
 

2009 American television seasons
2010 American television seasons